Clark Shultz (February 13, 1957) is a former Republican member of the Kansas Senate, representing the 35th district. Following the resignation of Jay Emler in January 2014, he was selected to take the position by Precinct and Township Republican Committeemen and Committeewomen. He previously served in the Kansas House of Representatives, representing the 73rd district. His position in the House was taken by Les Mason. He had served since 1997. He and his family currently reside in Lindsborg, KS

Committee membership
 Health and Human Services
 Financial Institutions
 Insurance (Chair)
 Rules and Journal (Chair)
 Select Committee on KPERS (Vice-Chair)

Major Donors
The top 5 donors to Shultz's 2008 campaign:
1. Kansas Assoc of Insurance Agents 	$1,000 	
2. Koch Industries 	$1,000 	
3. Kansas Bankers Assoc 	$1,000 	
4. Kansas Hospital Assoc 	$1,000 	
5. HSBC North America 	$1,000

References

External links
 Kansas Legislature - Clark Shultz
 Clark Shultz for Insurance Commissioner campaign website
 Project Vote Smart profile
 Kansas Votes profile
 State Surge - Legislative and voting track record
 Campaign contributions: 1996,1998,2000, 2002, 2004, 2006, 2008

Living people
Republican Party members of the Kansas House of Representatives
Republican Party Kansas state senators
People from Lindsborg, Kansas
1957 births
Wichita State University alumni
Baker University alumni
20th-century American politicians
21st-century American politicians